Olfactomedin 3, also known as noelin 3 or optimedin, is a protein that in humans is encoded by the OLFM3 gene.

Interactions
OLFM3 has been shown to interact with MYOC.

References

Further reading

Olfactomedins